The Siloam Baptist Church is a Baptist church in Marion, Alabama, affiliated with the Southern Baptist Convention. The current brick Greek Revival building was completed in 1848.

History 
Siloam Baptist Church was founded in June 1822, about the same time as the city of Marion. The principal founder was the pioneer preacher, Charles Crow. The first meetinghouse was built of logs; the second was an elaborate frame church built in 1837. Both of these church buildings were located near what is now the Marion Cemetery.

In 1838, members of Siloam founded Judson College. In 1842 Howard College, now Samford University in Birmingham was also started in Marion by the Baptists. It was here in 1844 that the Baptist State Convention adopted the “Alabama Resolutions” resulting in the separation of southern and northern Baptists in 1845, thus the beginning of the Southern Baptist Convention. The Home Mission Board of the Southern Baptist Convention held its organizational meeting here in 1845 around the table which still sits in the Memorial Parlor.

In November 1847, Siloam purchased the land on which the present church stands. L. Y. Tarrant was the architect and builder of the new church. Most of the work was done by slave labor; the bricks were made of local clay. The building was to be eighty-five feet by fifty feet with a full basement; the spire was to be one hundred twenty feet from the base. There was no concrete foundation; it was built on what was called a spread footing. A four-foot trench was dug and the entire trench filled with a layer of bricks four feet wide. The next layer came with one-half brick on each side and again consisted of a solid layer. This continued until the wall was two feet thick and then continued up at that width.

The building was dedicated and put into service in 1849.  At the time of dedication Siloam was the largest church west of Augusta, Georgia and was looked upon as the most vital church in the south west.  Marion was the center of mission work in Alabama and throughout the South.  The Alabama State Convention met here every other year from 1848 to 1868.

The sanctuary was plainly furnished. It was lighted by oil lamps hung in chandeliers and in wall brackets. The windows had three large sashes with small clear glass panes; these heavy sashes were on pulleys and cords, and were raised from the bottom and lowered from the top.

Members of this church were instrumental in establishing both Judson College in 1838 and Howard College, now Samford University,  in 1841.

An early writing tells us that the gallery took in three sides of the sanctuary and was occupied by slaves - thus stairs are entered from the outside. After the Civil War and the emancipation of the salves, Siloam helped establish Berean Baptist Church. The steeple on Berean is a duplicate of the original steeple on Siloam, which was replaced in 1949 after a fire.

“The Alabama Baptist” was first published in 1849 in Marion. It continued to be published here from 1849 to 1852 and again from 1874 to 1877.    

In 1894, Siloam's galleries were removed and the balcony was constructed,  the stained glass windows were put in place. A pipe organ was installed, it was operated by a hand pump and bellows.  In 1922 the organ was converted to an electric motor driven pump.   

The year 1926 brought the construction of an educational building at the back of the original sanctuary.

In 1955 an extensive renovation program was carried out in the historic sanctuary.  The walls and ceilings were replastered and painted, a new lighting system was installed, together with air conditioning. New carpets were laid and the pews refinished. The old pipe organ was replaced by an electronic organ.

The Memorial Parlor was established and furnished in 1958 as a fitting place in which to house the historical relics of Siloam.

In 1959 the church approved a program leading to construction of an educational wing for use by the Judson and Marion Institute students and the younger children. A joint effort of the Alabama Baptist State Convention and Siloam Baptist Church made possible the erection of this new educational unit.

The present Wicks organ was installed in 1974.

In 1982, Siloam Baptist Church was named to THE NATIONAL REGISTER OF HISTORICAL PLACES by the United States Department of the Interior.

The last major renovation of the sanctuary was done in the summer of 1997.   A new sound system was installed, the floors were reinforced and refinished.  The pews were refinished and  new pew cushions and new carpet were installed.   A new roof replaced the old and the walls were painted.  

In 2007, the long dream of many Siloam members came true as an elevator was installed that would service the sanctuary and  all floors for the educational building that was built in 1959.

Pastors List

The Pastors of Siloam 
   Charles Crow   1822-1830
  William Calloway  1830-1833
   James Veazy  1833-1835
   Samuel Larkin  1835-1836
  Peter Crawford 1836-1840
  James H. DeVotie  1840-1855
  William H. McIntosh  1855-1871
  Edwin T. Winkler 1872-1883
 Augustus C. Davidson  1884-1887
 Henry D. D. Stratton  1887-1890
 John L. Lawless  1890-1895
 Robert G. Patrick  1895-1896
 Paul V. Bomer  1897-1913
 George T. Waite 1913-1917
 Harry A. Bagby  1918-1921
 R. Kelly White  1922-1926
 Richard K. Redwine  1927-1932
 Samuel H. Jones  1932-1939
 Ralph E. Gwin  1939-1942
 Harry E. Dickinson  1943-1946
 Joseph N. Triplett 1947-1954
  W. E. Prout  1955-1963
 Ian G. C. Walker  1964-1965
 T. B. Stringfellow  1965-1968
 Douglas White  1969-1972
 Donald N. Paulson  1973-1976
 David W. Renaker  1977-1987
 Robbins Sims   1988-1991
 Michael Perry  1993-2003
 William R. “Bill” Cannon 2005-2006
  Scott Schuyler 2007-2009
 John W. Nicholson Jr. 2010-

See also
Historical Marker Database

References

National Register of Historic Places in Perry County, Alabama
Greek Revival church buildings in Alabama
Baptist churches in Alabama
Churches completed in 1848
19th-century Baptist churches in the United States
Southern Baptist Convention churches
Marion, Alabama